Tuubi is a Finnish television game show series. The series is shown on MTV3 and started on 7 March 2014.

Format
Tuubi is a game show based on YouTube videos. It is hosted by Vappu Pimiä and features two teams, which are captained by Sami Hedberg and Janne Kataja. On the show, the teams get to view various YouTube videos and have to answer questions based on them.

External links
 Tuubi on the MTV3 site

Finnish game shows